Perlach may refer to:

Ramersdorf-Perlach, one of 25 boroughs/districts of Munich, Germany
Perlachturm, (English: Perlach Tower), a bell tower built in 1182 in Augsburg, Germany
Andreas Perlach, court astrologer to Archduke Ferdinand of Habsburg

See also 
Perlakh, "0.000 01" or "One hundred-thousandth"